The 2018–19 Moldovan Under-19 Division was the Moldovan annual football tournament. The season began on 23 August 2018 and ended on 28 May 2019. Sheriff Tiraspol were the defending champions.

Stadia and locations

Squads
Players must be born on or after 1 January 2001, with a maximum of five players per team born between 1 January 2000 and 31 December 2000 allowed.

League table
The six clubs will play each other four times for a total of 20 matches per team.

Results 
Matches 1−10

Matches 11−20

References

2018–19 in Moldovan football